

Preseason
The Phillies held spring training in Savannah, Georgia, leaving Philadelphia on March 15, 1887 by train from Broad Street Station. The Phillies trained in Savannah through March 25.

The Phillies opened their preseason City Series against the Athletics on April 4, 1887 at the Athletics' Jefferson Street Grounds. 9,183 tickets were sold to the game and an "immense crowd" turned out to see the Phillies win by a score of 10 to 2.

Regular season 
 The Phillies moved into their new ballpark at 15th and Huntingdon Streets in April 1887. The park was to have opened on April 4, 1887 for the City Series game against the Athletics but inclement weather delayed final construction. 

The Phillies played their first game in the new ballpark on Saturday, April 30, 1887, the home opener against the New York Giants. 18,000 tickets were sold for the first game, with 13,000 in the stands and an additional 5,000 fans crowded onto the bicycle track which encircled the field and others in the terraces above left field. Philadelphia's Mayor Edwin Henry Fitler attended along with the city's political and business leadership, and many baseball leaders. The Phillies defeated New York 15 to 9.

Season standings

Record vs. opponents

Notable transactions 
 April 1887: Tom Gunning was purchased by the Phillies from the Boston Beaneaters.

Roster

Player stats

Batting

Starters by position 
Note: Pos = Position; G = Games played; AB = At bats; H = Hits; Avg. = Batting average; HR = Home runs; RBI = Runs batted in

Other batters 
Note: G = Games played; AB = At bats; H = Hits; Avg. = Batting average; HR = Home runs; RBI = Runs batted in

Pitching

Starting pitchers 
Note: G = Games pitched; IP = Innings pitched; W = Wins; L = Losses; ERA = Earned run average; SO = Strikeouts

Other pitchers 
Note: G = Games pitched; IP = Innings pitched; W = Wins; L = Losses; ERA = Earned run average; SO = Strikeouts

Relief pitchers 
Note: G = Games pitched; W = Wins; L = Losses; SV = Saves; ERA = Earned run average; SO = Strikeouts

Notes

References 
1887 Philadelphia Quakers season at Baseball Reference

Philadelphia Phillies seasons
Philadelphia Quakers season
Philadelphia